is a Japanese comedian and stage actress. She is usually starring in TBS's long-term program, King's brunch.

Her amiable behavior and chatting have won her a good reputation and popularity as a regular on that show. She is perhaps most recognizable from her playful "Kaimono Suki-na-Hime-sama" ("The Shopping-Loving Princess") character, and she is affectionately called "Emi chan" by other starring TV tarentos or announcers.

Dubbing 
Race to Witch Mountain, Dr. Alex Friedman (Carla Gugino)
Top Gun (2005 DVD edition), Carole Bradshaw (Meg Ryan)

References

External links
Welcome to Emi's : From her talent agent

Japanese women comedians
1973 births
People from Kagoshima
Living people